The 2015 Thai FA Cup Final was the final match of the 2015 Thai FA Cup, the 22nd season of a Thailand's football tournament organised by Football Association of Thailand. It was played at the Supachalasai Stadium in Bangkok, Thailand on 26 December 2015, between SCG Muangthong United a big team from the metropolitan region and Buriram United a big team from the northeastern region of Thailand.

Road to the final

In their semi-finals, SCG Muangthong United beat Army United 2–1. In the same way, Buriram United beat Chainat Hornbill 2–0 and qualified to the final.

Note: In all results below, the score of the finalist is given first (H: home; A: away; TPL: Clubs from Thai Premier League; D1: Clubs from Thai Division 1 League; D2: Clubs from Regional League Division 2).

Match

Details

Assistant referees:
 Haruhiro Otsuka (Japan)
 Ryo Hirama (Japan)
Fourth official:
Sivakorn Pu-udom (Thailand)

MATCH RULES
90 minutes.
30 minutes of extra-time if necessary.
Penalty shootout if scores still level.
Nine named substitutes
Maximum of 3 substitutions.

2015
1